Ex injuria jus non oritur (Latin for "law (or right) does not arise from injustice") is a principle of international law. The phrase implies that "illegal acts do not create law". Its rival principle is ex factis jus oritur, in which the existence of facts creates law.

See also

Ex factis jus oritur
Facts on the ground
Fait accompli
Status quo ante bellum
Odious debt
Uti possidetis

References

International law
Legal rules with Latin names

Giuliana Ziccardi Capaldo (1977) Le Situazioni Territoriali Illegittime nel Diritto Internazionale/Unlawful Territorial Situations in International Law. Editoriale Scientifica